Malokachakovo (Bäläkäy Qasaq) is a rural locality (a village) in Bolshekachakovsky Selsoviet, Kaltasinsky District, Bashkortostan, Russia. The population was 279 as of 2010. There are 5 streets.

Geography 
Malokachakovo is located 31 km southeast of Kaltasy (the district's administrative centre) by road. Bolshekachakovo is the nearest rural locality.

References 

Rural localities in Kaltasinsky District